CWC 2007 may refer to:
 FIFA Club World Cup 2007, in football (soccer)
 2007 Cricket World Cup, in cricket